The Day the Earth Caught Fire is a British science fiction disaster film starring Edward Judd, Leo McKern and Janet Munro. It was directed by Val Guest and released in 1961, and is one of the classic apocalyptic films of its era. The film opened at the Odeon Marble Arch in London on 23 November 1961.

The film, which was partly made on location in London and Brighton, used matte painting to create images of abandoned cities and desolate landscapes. The production also featured the real Daily Express, even using the paper's own headquarters, the Daily Express Building in Fleet Street, London, and featuring Arthur Christiansen as the Express editor, a job he had held in real life.

Plot
A lone man walks through the deserted streets of a sweltering London. The film then goes back several months. Peter Stenning (Judd) had been an up-and-coming journalist with the Daily Express, but since a divorce threw his life into disarray, he has been drinking too much (one of his lines is "Alcoholics of the press, unite!") and his work has suffered. His editor (Christiansen) has begun giving him lousy assignments. Stenning's only friend, Bill Maguire (McKern), is a veteran Fleet Street reporter who offers him encouragement and occasionally covers for him by writing his copy.

Meanwhile, after the Soviet Union and the United States simultaneously detonate nuclear bomb tests, strange meteorological events begin to affect the globe. Stenning is sent to the British Met Office to obtain temperature data, and while there he meets Jeanie (Munro), a young typist who is temporarily acting as telephonist. They "meet cute", trading insults; later, they fall in love.

Stenning then discovers that the weapons tests have had a massive effect on Earth. He asks Jeannie to help him get any relevant information. It becomes apparent that Earth's nutation has been altered by 11 degrees, affecting the climatic zones and changing the pole and the equator. The increasing heat has caused water to evaporate and mists to cover Britain, and  a solar eclipse occurs days ahead of schedule. Later, characters realise that the orbit of the Earth has been disrupted and the planet is spiralling in towards the Sun.

The government imposes a state of emergency and starts rationing water and supplies. People start evacuating the cities. Scientists conclude that the only way to bring Earth back into a safe orbit is to detonate a series of nuclear bombs in western Siberia. Stenning, Maguire, and Jeanie gather at a bar to listen to the radio broadcast of the event. The bombs are detonated, and the shock wave causes dust to fall from the bar's ceiling.

At the newspaper print room, two versions of the front page have been prepared: one reads "World Saved", the other "World Doomed". The film ends without revealing which one will be published, and in the words that talking Stenning where "humanity will recover after all this horror."

Cast

 Edward Judd as Peter Stenning
 Leo McKern as Bill Maguire
 Janet Munro as Jeannie Craig
 Michael Goodliffe as 'Jacko', the night editor
 Bernard Braden as the news editor
 Reginald Beckwith as Harry
 Gene Anderson as May
 Renée Asherson as Angela
 Arthur Christiansen as Jeff Jefferson, the editor
 Austin Trevor as Sir John Kelly
 Edward Underdown as Dick Sanderson
 Ian Ellis as Michael Stenning
 Peter Butterworth as second sub-editor (uncredited)
 Pamela Green as a shower steward (uncredited)
 Michael Caine as a police constable (uncredited)
 Norman Chappell as a Hotel receptionist (uncredited)

Arthur Christiansen, a former editor of the Daily Express, played the editor of the newspaper. Three years before Zulu, a then-unknown Michael Caine played an uncredited police officer diverting traffic.

Production
Val Guest said there was a lack of enthusiasm to make the film and he only managed to persuade British Lion to finance it by putting up his profits from Expresso Bongo as collateral. All the finance was British.

 
The film was made in black and white but in some original prints, the opening and closing sequences are tinted orange-yellow to suggest the heat of the sun. It was shot with 35 mm anamorphic lenses using the French Dyaliscope process.

Critic Doug Cummings said, about the look of the film, Guest also manages some visual flair. The film was shot in anamorphic widescreen, and the extended frame is always perfectly balanced with groups of people, city vistas, or detailed settings, whether bustling newsrooms, congested streets, or humid apartments. Although the film's special effects aren't particularly noteworthy, matte paintings and the incorporation of real London locations work to good atmospheric advantage (heavy rains buffet the windows; thick, unexpected fog wafts through the city; a raging hurricane crashes into the British coast). Guest also cleverly incorporates stock footage to depict floods and meteorological disasters worldwide. The visual style of the film is straightforward and classical, but each scene is rendered with a great degree of realism and sense of place.

Reviewer Paul A. Green wrote, "Guest and his editor Bill Lenny worked with archive footage. There's a quick shot of a fire-engine from The Quatermass Experiment – but otherwise you can't see the joins."

In his commentary track for the 2001 Anchor Bay DVD release, director Val Guest stated that the sound of church bells heard at the very end of the American version had been added by distributor Universal, in order to suggest that the emergency detonation had succeeded and that the Earth had been saved. Guest speculated that the bells motif had been inspired by the film The War of the Worlds (1953), which ends with the joyous ringing of church bells after the emergency (and a nuclear explosion). But Guest maintained that his intention was to always have an ambiguous ending.

In August 2014 a restored version was screened at the British Museum's summer open air cinema.

The film makes one medical error. When a copy boy collapses in the news room, as a result of drinking black market contaminated water, the doctor announces he has 'typhus' and everyone has to be inoculated. Typhus is not water-borne (it is insect-borne) and neither was there an inoculation for it at the time when the film was made. The script writer probably confused typhus with typhoid fever. Typhoid is water-borne and various injection treatments did exist then.

Certification
The film was rated "X" (minimum age 16 admitted) by the British Board of Film Censors on its initial release. A 2001 DVD release from Network Releasing was given a BBFC DVD/Blu-ray certificate of "15" (years and over). On the 2014 BFI release, the rating was reduced to "12".

Locations
The film was shot in London and South East England. Principal photography included Fleet Street (the Daily Express building), Battersea Park, the HM Treasury Building in Westminster and on Brighton Palace Pier.

Themes 
Essayist Paul A. Green discusses many of the themes in the film in his review:

News media – "We see a media landscape that is largely defined through the press and its heavy-duty Gutenberg technology, and a political landscape that is defined through the Cold War ... The bustling newsroom with its exhorting wall poster slogans (Go for IMPACT!) is a nexus of conflicting information and misinformation, conjecture and rumour as the hacks try to get an angle on freak weather conditions in the silly season." Green adds about a late scene, "Today the sequence reads like an elegy for the old Fleet Street culture of "The Print" which gave life-time employment to thousands of Cockneys, until Murdoch introduced computerised newsrooms, smashed the print unions and moved operations to Docklands, eventually dragging the rest of Fleet Street with him."
Nuclear weapons testing – "Then the premise of the film – that nuclear tests alter the earth's orbit, disrupt the climate and send the planet spiralling towards the sun – makes a deeper impact ... Global destruction through nuclear war is becoming an existential reality... Nuclear holocaust anxieties in the movies were not new, of course. But these fears were usually externalised as monster mutation narratives..."
Escapism – "Everyone's keeping busy except boozy Stenning, who clearly resents being tasked to write a lightweight piece about sun-spots, when he used to be the paper's hotshot columnist with serious ambitions as a writer. He'd rather be in Harry's Bar, a cosy all-day drinking club modelled on Fleet Street's El Vino's."
Social class – "Stenning's discontent is not explicitly political, in any specific ideological sense ... But there's the same restlessness about the restrictions of class. Stenning voices a distrust of traditional upper-crust Anglo-Saxon attitudes that parallels the increasingly awkward questions the narrative raises about the inertia of the British Establishment, as well as the mood of a Britain on the edge of social change. "You ought to see the way they're bringing him up, Bill. It'll be the right prep school next. And then the right boarding school. And by the time they finish with him, he'll be a right bowler-hatted, who's-for-tennis, toffee-nosed gent, but he won't be MY son...."
Gender politics – "This encounter with Jeanie signals the beginning of Stenning's slow transformation. It also exemplifies the transformation of gender politics in UK bureaucracy since 1961. Today a bright woman like Jeannie would probably be running the whole department rather than servicing a duplicating machine, which is where Stenning discovers her. "I'm not women!" she informs Stenning, when he makes one of his bar-room generalisations."
End of the world – "Stenning manages to photograph the flaring black disc of the sun – a superb piece of metonymy for the looming threat of extinction ... As I. Q Hunter points out in British Science Fiction Cinema the film progresses through a reprise of the city's collective memories and myths of World War Two – the Blitz, fire-storms, black-out, the miseries of rationing, evacuation of children, black marketeering and gangsterism. It raises the issue of whether post-war Britain could maintain the Dunkirk spirit in the face of a new threat. There's a hint, voiced by Maguire earlier, that "we've gone soft" and that under these new and even more extreme circumstances, social cohesion might unravel and give way to hysteria."

Reception

Box office
The film made a profit of £22,500. According to Kinematograph Weekly the film was considered a "money maker" at the British box office in 1962.

Critical response
The film holds an 86% "Certified Fresh" rating on the review aggregate website Rotten Tomatoes. Critic Doug Cummings called it "an unusually literate and thematically nuanced genre film," adding, The disaster genre is not generally known for its insights into characters or its clever dialogue, but The Day the Earth Caught Fire is an admirable exception. Its attention to the inner and outer lives of its protagonists makes its physical doom an externalized metaphor for Stenning's personal life, off-kilter and spinning out of control, both fates equally weighted between hope and despair.

Reviewer Dennis Schwartz wrote, An intelligent low-budget sci-fi doomsday pic that gives us an authentic Fleet Street look at an old-fashioned newspaper office back in the day and a suspenseful scenario of the world tinkering on destruction as seen through the eyes of the newspaper. Val Guest ... efficiently directs by making good use of the atmospheric effects such as the extreme heat and mist on Londoners, which gives this fascinating story an eerie feel. Guest and Wolf Mankowitz write a taut screenplay, with an observant look at the London scene.

Paul Green, cited above, wrote in a 2005 commentary, London is on the cusp of the sixties, where protest and youth cultures are breaking through, but social and sexual mores are still semi-formalised and girls work in typing pools ... In a contemporary context of global warming, asymmetric warfare, nuclear proliferation and dwindling resources, the film's underlying optimism seems touching.

Awards
Val Guest and Wolf Mankowitz received the 1962 BAFTA for Best Film Screenplay for The Day the Earth Caught Fire.

See also
 List of apocalyptic films
 List of nuclear holocaust fiction
 "The Midnight Sun", an episode of The Twilight Zone with a similar premise

References

Notes

External links
 
 
 
 
 

1961 films
1960s science fiction films
1960s disaster films
Apocalyptic films
British black-and-white films
British disaster films
British science fiction films
1960s English-language films
Environmental films
Films about journalists
Films about nuclear war and weapons
Films set in Brighton
Films set in London
Films shot in East Sussex
Films shot in London
Films directed by Val Guest
British post-apocalyptic films
Films about World War III
Films with screenplays by Wolf Mankowitz
Films scored by Monty Norman
1960s British films